Duke Eugen of Württemberg (21 November 1758 – 20 June 1822) was a German prince. He was the brother of Frederick I of Württemberg.

Life
Duke Eugen was born at Schwedt, Margraviate of Brandenburg, the third child of Frederick II Eugene, Duke of Württemberg (1732–1797), (son of Charles Alexander, Duke of Württemberg, and Princess Maria Augusta of Thurn and Taxis) and his wife, Margravine Sophia Dorothea of Brandenburg-Schwedt (1736–1798), (daughter of Frederick William, Margrave of Brandenburg-Schwedt and Princess Sophia Dorothea of Prussia).

Eugen was educated by Johann Georg Schlosser, a brother of Johann Wolfgang von Goethe. The prince entered the Army of the Kingdom of Prussia. His regiment the Oleśnica Silesian Hussars being stationed, at that time, near the residence of Eugen's relatives, part of the Duchy of Oels. Whose last Duke Charles Christian Erdmann, left Eugen, in his will, and by fee-tail, the estate of Pokój, Carlsruhe Palace.

From 1795 Eugen was governor of the fortress of Glogau. In the War of the Fourth Coalition, at the Battle of Jena-Auerstedt he commanded the Reserve cavalry of the Prussian Army. On 18 October 1806 he fought at the Battle of Halle where he was defeated by Marshal Jean Bernadotte (later became King Charles XIV John of Sweden).

Carlsruhe became the permanent residence of Duke Eugen, which he endowed with a theater and chapel. The Duke was a great patron of the composer Carl Maria von Weber, who became his secretary and in September 1806 he was designated as Kapellmeister at Carlsruhe. Eugen's son, distinguished himself in the War of the Sixth Coalition which led to the theater being closed, and Carl Maria von Weber dismissed.  In 1820 Eugen built the Cavalier Homes on the Schlossplatz in Carlsruhe.

From 1820 until his death Eugen was a member of the First Chamber of the Estates of Württemberg though he never appeared in person to the meetings, being represented by Count Charles of Reischach.

Marriage and issue
On 21 January 1787, in Meiningen, he married Princess Louise of Stolberg-Gedern, daughter of Prince Christian Karl of Stolberg-Gedern and Countess Eleonore Reuss of Lobenstein. Louise was the widow of Charles William, Duke of Saxe-Meiningen. They had five children:
 Duke Eugen of Württemberg (18 January 1788 – 16 September 1857), married in 1817 to Princess Mathilde of Waldeck and Pyrmont, had issue; Married secondly in 1827 to Princess Helene of Hohenlohe-Langenburg, had issue.
 Duchess Louise of Württemberg (4 June 1789 – 26 June 1851), married in 1811 to Friedrich August Karl, Prince of Hohenlohe-Oehringen, had issue. 
 Duke Georg Ferdinand of Württemberg (15 June 1790 – 25 December 1795)
 Duke Heinrich of Württemberg (13 December 1792 –28 November 1797)
 Duke Paul Wilhelm of Württemberg (25 June 1797 – 25 November 1860), married in 1827 to Princess Maria Sophia of Thurn and Taxis, had issue.

Ancestry

Notes and sources

The Royal House of Stuart, London, 1969, 1971, 1976, Addington, A. C., Reference: page 222
L'Allemagne dynastique, Huberty, Giraud, Magdelaine, Reference: vol II page 476.

1758 births
1822 deaths
People from Schwedt
People from the Margraviate of Brandenburg
Prussian commanders of the Napoleonic Wars
German Lutherans
Dukes of Württemberg (titular)
Military personnel from Brandenburg
Sons of monarchs